I Wonder Do You Think of Me is the third studio album by American country music artist Keith Whitley. It was posthumously released in August 1989 by RCA Records, three months after Whitley's death from alcohol poisoning. It peaked at #2 on the Top Country Albums chart, and is certified gold by the RIAA. The album includes the singles "I Wonder Do You Think of Me", "It Ain't Nothin'" and "I'm Over You", the first two of which were Number One country hits.

Also included are two songs which later became singles for other artists: A Don Everly cover of "Brother Jukebox" that went on to become a Number One country single in 1991 for Mark Chesnutt from the album Too Cold at Home, and "Between an Old Memory and Me" which was a number 11 country single in 1995 for Travis Tritt from the album Ten Feet Tall and Bulletproof.

Track listing

Personnel
 Eddie Bayers – drums
 Paul Franklin – steel guitar, pedabro
 Rob Hajacos – fiddle
 Mac McAnally – acoustic guitar
 Brent Mason – electric guitar
 Dave Pomeroy – bass guitar
 Matt Rollings – piano
 Billy Sanford – electric guitar
 Biff Watson – keyboards
 Keith Whitley – lead vocals
 Dennis Wilson – background vocals
 Curtis Young – background vocals

Charts

Weekly charts

Year-end charts

Certifications

References

Keith Whitley albums
1989 albums
RCA Records albums
Albums produced by Garth Fundis
Albums published posthumously